Adam Samuel Bouchard (born March 12, 1996) is a Canadian soccer player who last played for Toronto FC II in the USL.

Club career

Early career
In April 2013 he and two teammates (including Nicolás Galvis) left Oakville SC to sign for Uruguayan club Defensor Sporting. After a year in Uruguay, he returned to Canada and joined TFC Academy in October 2014.

Toronto FC II
Bouchard signed his first professional contract with Toronto FC II, Toronto FC's reserve team, on March 20, 2015. He made his debut on March 21 against the Charleston Battery.

International career
Bouchard was named to the Canadian roster for the 2013 FIFA U-17 World Cup. He also participated in a U-20 camp in May 2014.

References

External links
 
 
 

Living people
1996 births
Association football midfielders
Canadian soccer players
Soccer people from Ontario
Sportspeople from Burlington, Ontario
Sportspeople from Oakville, Ontario
Canadian expatriate soccer players
Expatriate footballers in Uruguay
Canadian expatriate sportspeople in Uruguay
Defensor Sporting players
Milltown FC players
Toronto FC players
Toronto FC II players
USL Championship players
Canada men's under-23 international soccer players
Footballers at the 2015 Pan American Games
Pan American Games competitors for Canada